is a former Japanese football player.

Playing career
Kobayashi was born in Sapporo on April 18, 1980. After graduating from University of Tsukuba, he joined J1 League club Urawa Reds in 2003. He played 3 matches in a row as center back from opening game in first season. However he could hardly play in the match after that. In 2005, he moved to Kawasaki Frontale. However he could not play at all in the match. In 2006, he moved to J2 League club Yokohama FC. He played many matches as regular player in summer. In 2007, he moved to Regional Leagues club Fervorosa Ishikawa Hakuzan FC. In July 2007, he moved to Japan Football League (JFL) club TDK (later Blaublitz Akita). In 2008, he moved to J1 club Oita Trinita. He played many matches and Trinita won the champions in 2008 J.League Cup first major title in the club history. However Trinita was relegated to J2 end of 2009 season. In 2011, he moved to JFL club Blaublitz Akita for the first time in 3 years. Although he played many matches as regular player in 2011, his opportunity to play decreased in 2012 and he retired end of 2012 season.

Club Statistics

References

External links 

1980 births
Living people
University of Tsukuba alumni
Association football people from Hokkaido
Sportspeople from Sapporo
Japanese footballers
J1 League players
J2 League players
Japan Football League players
Urawa Red Diamonds players
Kawasaki Frontale players
Yokohama FC players
Blaublitz Akita players
Oita Trinita players
Association football defenders